The Sportswoman of the Year Award is given by the Women's Sports Foundation every year. This foundation recognizes both an individual and a team Sportswoman on their performance over a 12-month period. This award is given based on their new records and their world championships won.

In 2012, the winners of the Sportswoman of the Year Award were Gabrielle Douglas (Individual Sport) and Alex Morgan (Team Sport).

The following table reflects past winners of the Sportswoman of the Year Award in individual and team sports.

Individual Sport Winner

Team Sport Winner

Amateur Winner

Professional Winner

See also

 List of sports awards honoring women

References

External links
 

Sports awards honoring women
Women's sports in the United States
Awards established in 1980
Women's association football trophies and awards
Women's Sports Foundation